Reecha Sinha is an Indian actress, model. She is active in Bollywood since 2016 and her latest Hindi movie is The Last Resort, released on 2021.

Reecha Sinha played the lead role in The Last Resort is produced by Irfan Izhar She also acted in Dongri Ka Raja, Milan Talkies. In 2020, Reecha did a music video Gud Khake with Shantanu Maheshwari. Her next film Daffan, which is set to be release in the first quarter of 2022.

Career
After completion of graduation, enters the entertainment industry. She got breakthrough in 2016 Hindi film Dongari Ka Raja. In 2019, she played a pivotal role with Ali Fazal, in  Dhulia’s Milan Talkies.

Succeeded in modeling and seen in many commercials of Flite Footwear, Skinnsi, Koovs, Revlon, Godrej UV Case, Bikaji Bhelpuri, FCUK, Timex, Renee, Boddess Beauty and Everteen. Beauty and skincare brand, No Scars, featuring Reecha Sinha in its TVC since 2015. She was also seen in a music album called Repeat. Presently she is working on many digital entertainment projects, including the upcoming movie Daffan.

Filmography
All films are in Hindi, unless otherwise noted.

Web series 
She worked in a web series titled Zoo - Infotainment, presented by Dropout Media & directed by Shubham Dolas.

See also

Cinema of India
Bollywood
Reecha Sharma

References

External links 

Indian film actresses
Living people
Actresses from Mumbai
Actresses in Hindi cinema
Date of birth unknown
21st-century Indian actresses
Year of birth missing (living people)